The M93 Black Arrow (/M93 Crna strela) is a 12.7×108mm anti-materiel rifle developed and manufactured by Zastava Arms.

Overview
The rifle was designed in 1993 and entered production in 1998. The primary purpose of this rifle is long-range engagement and due to that, it is provided with an optical sight, which is included in the rifle set (8x magnification with the division up to 1,800 m) and a backup iron sight. Its mount can accept the sights of other manufacturers as well.

Design and features
The Zastava M93 Black Arrow rifle is available in both 12.7×108mm and .50 BMG. It is a bolt-action, air-cooled, magazine-fed firearm with a fixed stock. The weapon is fed through a 5- or 10-round detachable, spring-loaded box magazine. The shoulder stock has a telescoping design, sitting aft of the ergonomic pistol grip unit. The bolt-action handle rests over the right side of the gun body. A carrying handle is affixed to the forend and the barrel is capped by a multi-baffled brake to assist in handling the massive recoil action. A folding bipod is also attached.

Its overall design is a scale-up of the Mauser 98 system, similarly to the Mauser 1918 T-Gewehr, with some influence from the French FR-F1
However the FR-F1 was built on basis of MAS-36 that was also influenced by Gewehr 98 (Mauser 98). Therefore the M93 and FR-F1 have some roots in Mauser 98. 
The M93 has a trigger block safety design similar to Russian SVT 40 rifle

Users

 : Used by Army Marksman

: Peshmerga

: Used by Philippine Marines

  YPG

See also

Zastava M12
Zastava M76
Zastava M91
Zastava M07
List of sniper rifles

References

Sources

M93
12.7 mm sniper rifles
.50 BMG sniper rifles
12.7×108 mm sniper rifles
Zastava Arms
Bolt-action rifles
Anti-materiel rifles
Serbian design